"This Love of Mine" is a popular American song that was first recorded in 1941 by Tommy Dorsey and His orchestra, with a vocal by Frank Sinatra. Sinatra wrote the words and Sol Parker and Hank Sanicola wrote the music.

Background
The Tommy Dorsey recording was released as a 78 RCA Victor B side single, 27508-B, with Frank Sinatra on vocals backed with "Neiani", which did not chart. "This Love of Mine" reached #3 on the Billboard pop singles chart in 1941–42 in a chart run of 24 weeks. Sinatra re-recorded the song with Nelson Riddle in 1955 for the In The Wee Small Hours album.

The song was copyrighted on August 11, 1941 by Embassy Music. Frank Sinatra was credited with writing the lyrics although this has been disputed by his aide, Tony Consiglio. The music was composed by Sol Parker and Hank Sanicola.

Other recordings
The song became a pop and jazz standard that has been recorded by other performers. Artists who have recorded the song include:

References

Sources
Granata, Charles L. (1999). Sessions with Sinatra: Frank Sinatra and the Art of Recording. Chicago Review Press.  
Phasey, Chris (1995). Francis Albert Sinatra: Tracked Down (Discography). Buckland Publications. 
Summers, Antony and Swan, Robbyn (2005). Sinatra: The Life. Doubleday. 

1941 songs
Frank Sinatra songs
1940s jazz standards
Pop standards
Songs written by Frank Sinatra
Songs written by Hank Sanicola